Çatalcaspor is a Turkish football club from Istanbul that plays in the TFF Third League.

League Participations
 TFF Third League: 2014–present
 Turkish Regional Amateur League: 2011–2014
 Amatör Futbol Ligleri: ??

Stadium
Currently the team plays at the 1150 capacity Ziya Altınoğlu Stadı.

References

External links
Çatalcaspor on TFF.org

Football clubs in Turkey
Football clubs in Istanbul